Cam DiNunzio was born on January 6, 1974, in Virginia. He is known most for his role in the band Denali as guitarist.

Career
DiNunzio joined Denali in 2000 after being asked by singer Maura Davis to help fill out the band along with drummer Jonathan Fuller and bassist Keeley Davis.  The band released two albums on Jade Tree Records before disbanding in 2004.  Other than Denali, he was a member of various Richmond, Virginia, band including Grip, Lazycain, and for a short period of time, River City High. In 1995, he did a short touring stint with Four Walls Falling.  In 2009 he formed a new band called Heks Orkest, featuring former Denali bandmates Davis and Fuller.  Other members include Ed Trask, formerly of Avail, Kepone, and Holy Rollers, and David Grant, formerly of Action Patrol, The Episode, and Service Anxiety.

DiNunzio was born in Virginia Beach, Virginia, and grew up there before going to college at Virginia Commonwealth University in Richmond, Virginia, in 1992.  He graduated in 1997 with an English degree, and in 2005 he moved to New York City to work for various record labels before returning in 2008 to Richmond to work for a then-new music house called Black Iris Music.  Heks Orkest began in 2009, and has played sporadic shows since then.

References 

Living people
1974 births
Guitarists from Virginia
Musicians from Virginia Beach, Virginia
Virginia Commonwealth University alumni
Musicians from New York City
Musicians from Richmond, Virginia
American male guitarists
21st-century American guitarists
21st-century American male musicians